Mis Favoritas ("My Favorites") is the title of a compilation album released by Mexican singer-songwriter Juan Gabriel on June 8, 2010.

Track listing

References

External links
  Official website Juan Gabriel
 Official website on Universal Music
 
 Mis Favoritas on iTunes

2010 compilation albums
Juan Gabriel compilation albums
Spanish-language albums